Thorsten Altenkirch is a German Professor of Computer Science at the University of Nottingham known for his research on logic, type theory, and homotopy type theory. Altenkirch was part of the 2012/2013 special year on univalent foundations at the Institute for Advanced Study. At Nottingham he co-chairs the Functional Programming Laboratory with Graham Hutton.

Education
Altenkirch obtained his PhD from the University of Edinburgh in 1993 under Rod Burstall.

Contributions
Altenkirch's work includes: Containers, Epigram programming language, and Homotopy Type Theory: Univalent Foundations of Mathematics (The HoTT Book).

Altenkirch has also been a guest on the YouTube channel Computerphile.

References

External links
Altenkirch's personal page at Nottingham
Altenkirch's newer page at Nottingham  

Computer scientists
Year of birth missing (living people)
Living people
Alumni of the University of Edinburgh
Academics of the University of Nottingham
Place of birth missing (living people)